QPR usually refers to Queens Park Rangers F.C., an English football club.

QPR may also refer to:

 Queens Park Rangers W.F.C., now known as Hounslow W.F.C., an English women's football club
 QPR Software, a Finnish software firm
 Queen + Paul Rodgers, a 2004–09 musical supergroup
 Queens Park Rangers SC, a football club playing in Grenada's Premier Division
 Queensland Premier Rugby, a rugby club in Australia 
 Queerplatonic relationship, a neologism referring to non-romantic relationships between significant others.
 Quality-Price Ratio, in wine terminology, a designation for rating wine